Shtula (lit. Planted) is a moshav in northern Israel. Located in the Upper Galilee near the Lebanese border, it falls under the jurisdiction of Ma'ale Yosef Regional Council.

History
The moshav was established in 1967 by moshav residents from the Galilee as part of Operation Sof Sof, designed to strengthen Jewish presence in the Galilee. Its name is symbolic and has a similar meaning to that of nearby Netu'a. Many residents originated from the town of Koy Sanjaq in Iraq and children in the moshav used to learn Koy Sanjaq Jewish Neo-Aramaic.

The moshav is located on the land of the Palestinian villages of Suruh and Tarbikha, which were depopulated in the 1948 Arab–Israeli War. 

The village was the site of Hezbollah's cross-border raid in the 2006 Lebanon War, in which three Israeli soldiers were killed and two captured.

References

External links
Official website 

Moshavim
Populated places established in 1967
Populated places in Northern District (Israel)
1967 establishments in Israel